Hooks Independent School District is a public school district based in Hooks, Texas (USA).

In 2009, the school district was rated "academically acceptable" by the Texas Education Agency.

Schools
Hooks High School (Grades 9-12)
Hooks Junior High (Grades 5-8)
Hooks Elementary (Grades PK-4)

In 2009, Hooks High had an enrollment of 360 students, Hooks Junior High had an enrollment of 276 students, and Hooks Elementary had an enrollment of 398 students.

Notable alumni
 Dave Richard Palmer, class of 1952.
 Billy Sims, class of 1975.

References

External links
Hooks ISD

School districts in Bowie County, Texas